Glenmoral is a rural locality in the Shire of Banana, Queensland, Australia.

Road infrastructure
The Leichhardt Highway runs past the eastern extremity, near Theodore.

References 

Shire of Banana
Localities in Queensland